The Problem with Jon Stewart is an American late night current affairs television series hosted by Jon Stewart on Apple TV+. Each episode focuses on a single issue. The series premiered on September 30, 2021. The second season premiered on October 7, 2022.

Production
In October 2020, as part of a multi-year production deal with Apple, it was announced that Jon Stewart was creating a new current affairs series for Apple TV+, marking his return to the format since leaving The Daily Show in 2015.

Throughout early 2021, the show was building out its production team, hiring Brinda Adhikari to serve as showrunner and executive producer, Chelsea Devantez as head writer, and Lorrie Baranek as Stewart's executive in charge of production in February 2021. Adhikari was a longtime network news veteran before coming on to the show. Around the same time, Busboy Productions posted job listings seeking to fill positions for all aspects of the production.

On April 7, 2021, the title of The Problem with Jon Stewart was announced, as well as a late 2021 premiere date for the series.

Each episode lasts one hour, and focuses on a single issue that is "currently part of the national conversation and [Stewart's] advocacy work". Apple has said that the show will run for multiple seasons, and each season will be accompanied by a companion podcast, co-hosted by Stewart and his writing and production staff and following up on each episode.

The series began filming in front of a live studio audience in New York City on July 14, 2021.

Episodes

Series Overview

Season 1 (2021-22)

Season 2 (2022–2023)

Release
The Problem with Jon Stewart premiered its first episode on September 30, 2021, on Apple TV+, with one new episode initially scheduled to premiere every other Thursday. The series is accompanied by a weekly podcast that premiered on September 30, 2021.

See also
The Daily Show
 List of late night network TV programs

References

External links

 Official YouTube Channel

2021 American television series debuts
2020s American late-night television series
2020s American television talk shows
Apple TV+ original programming
English-language television shows
Web talk shows
American non-fiction web series
Television shows filmed in New York City
Jon Stewart
The Daily Show